All time records for D.C. United against opponents in distinct competitive matches.

Table key

Major League Soccer

Regular season

MLS Cup Playoffs

U.S. Open Cup 

Similar to England's FA Cup, the U.S. Open Cup is the oldest soccer tournament in the United States. The first competition dates back to 1914. In the 1920s, professional American Soccer League clubs were allowed to play in the tournament, but following the folding of the original ASL, the Open Cup (then called the Challenge Cup) was only open to amateur clubs. It wasn't until 1995 that professional clubs were allowed to enter the competition. 

Today, the competition is open to any American soccer club affiliated with the United States Soccer Federation. The United have participated in 14 Open Cups in their existence, winning the 1996 and 2008 editions of the tournament.

Champions League 

D.C. United first participated in the CONCACAF Champions League back when the tournament was called the CONCACAF Champions Cup. They debuted in the competition in 1997, subsequent to winning the 1996 MLS Cup. They have appeared in nine tournaments, more than any other American club, by winning four MLS Cup championships, four MLS Supporters' Shield league championships and one U.S. Open Cup championship. 

The United are also one of only two American soccer clubs in history to win a continental title, the other being Los Angeles Galaxy. The United won the 1998 edition of the tournament. Since then, their best results have been semifinal runs in 2007 and 2008.

SuperLiga 

D.C. United has participated in two North American SuperLiga's to-date. The SuperLiga, similar to UEFA's Europa League is the second-highest international soccer competition in North America. 

Originally, the tournament was by invitation-only, in an effort to market to MLS markets with high Hispanic populations, as well to emphasize the arrival of David Beckham with the L.A. Galaxy. In 2008, the tournament was for the best four overall clubs in MLS, which is how D.C. United qualified, by being the Supporters' Shield winners, and having a 1st place overall record.

In 2009 the SuperLiga format changed to allow more clubs to have international play, and to decongest the schedules for Champions League clubs. It's now for the best MLS and Primera División de México clubs that do not qualify for the CONCACAF Champions League. Below are D.C. United's records vs. all opponents they have faced in the SuperLiga:

Results

Footnotes 

A : Includes matches played in the MLS Cup Playoffs and MLS Cup. All results are referenced to ESPN Soccernet, and RSSSF.
B : Chivas USA and Real Salt Lake are expansion teams that joined MLS in the 2005 season.
C : The Portland Timbers and the Vancouver Whitecaps joined MLS in the 2011 season.
D : The Seattle Sounders joined MLS in the 2009 season.
E : The Chicago Fire are an expansion team that joined MLS in the 1997 season.
F : The Houston Dynamo is an expansion team that joined MLS in the 2006 season.
G : The Philadelphia Union are an expansion team that joined MLS in the 2010 season.
H : Toronto FC is an expansion team that joined MLS in the 2007 season.
I : Includes qualification matches. All results are referenced to United States Soccer Federation, and RSSSF.
J :  Includes preliminary round matches. All results are references to ESPN Soccernet, and RSSSF.

References 

D.C. United
American soccer clubs records and statistics